A buoyancy engine is a device that alters the buoyancy of a vehicle or object in order to either move it vertically, as in the case of underwater profiling floats and stealth buoys, or provide forward motion (therefore providing variable-buoyancy propulsion) such as with underwater gliders and some autonomous aircraft.

For underwater applications, buoyancy engines typically involve a hydraulic pump that either inflates and deflates an external bladder filled with hydraulic fluid, or extends and retracts a rigid plunger. The change in the vehicle's total volume alters its buoyancy, making it  float upwards or sink as required. Alternative systems employing gas obtained from water electrolysis, rather than hydraulic fluid, have also been proposed, as have systems which pump ambient water into and out of a pressure vessel.

Operation 
The buoyancy engine is a fairly new piece of technology currently in research by many institutions and organizations that utilize underwater surveillance and mapping technologies.  A buoyancy engine works by inflating and deflating an oil bladder. In doing so, this changes the density of the craft the engine is installed on. As a result, an autonomous underwater vehicle such as an underwater glider can adjust its buoyancy without external input.  This allows the glider to remain in operation, untethered to a surface vessel, for a longer duration of time. This increases efficiency and makes the underwater glider a more viable tool for mapping the ocean floor.

An underwater glider works similarly to how a normal glider works.  It utilizes the flow of water over a set of wings to generate lift.  The shape of the wings are a specially designed shape called an airfoil. Underwater gliders use this same principle and design to glide underwater. The way weight is distributed within the underwater glider helps with this by putting the center of gravity at or just in front of the leading edge of the wings.  This promotes an efficient and smooth glide slope. The buoyancy engine allows an underwater glider to continue this gliding process for extended periods of time. Without a buoyancy engine, an underwater glider would either have to be towed by a surface vessel or only be used once and deploy a package that would float to the surface where it can be retrieved.  However, if it is towed by a surface vessel, then it is no longer classified as a glider. With the addition of a buoyancy engine, the underwater glider becomes a viable tool as it can stay in operation longer and can be reused.

An underwater glider, like an aircraft glider, loses altitude as it moves forward.  In the case of an underwater glider, its depth increases. Eventually, any glider will touch the ground.  With a gliding aircraft, this is not much of an issue since they are expected to land and are reusable when they do so.  This is not true for an underwater glider. If an underwater glider were to land on the ocean floor, it is essentially lost.  Since a buoyancy engine allows a glider to change its density, the glider can glide in two directions. It can glide down like an aircraft, or it can glide up if it makes itself less dense than the water around it.  In this way, as long as the buoyancy engine remains active, an underwater glider can continue to operate.

The actual operation of a buoyancy engine occurs through a complex system of tubing, valves, and sensors.  When a glider equipped with a buoyancy engine is deployed, the glider will increase its density to sink to an appropriate depth at which to start its mission.  Once at that depth, the glider will begin the mission and the buoyancy engine will adjust the density to a value that is efficient for gliding. When a predetermined depth has been reached, the buoyancy engine will decrease density and this will cause the glider to glide back towards the surface.  In this way, the underwater glider remains in operation between two preset depths. The mechanism used to modify buoyancy for this purpose is often a variable buoyancy pressure vessel.

Application 
The buoyancy engine, when combined with the underwater glider, gives scientists and other individuals or organizations access to hardware to survey the ocean depths.  For instance, the buoyancy engine, since it is used on underwater gliders and extends the capabilities of such craft, would be able to more effectively map the ocean floor. The use of the buoyancy engine has other effects as well.  It could be used to improve the detection of underwater stores of oil. In addition, since the operational range of underwater gliders is increased through the use of buoyancy engines, ocean floors can be mapped in larger sections which is more efficient than pre-existing technologies. Also, buoyancy engines do not give off environmentally harmful substances making them an environmentally safe technology.

Other applications that extend from this include investigating disasters that happen at sea.  Due to the increased mapping capabilities provided by the buoyancy engine, searching for the wreckage of an airliner or passenger ship can be conducted more economically by a larger number of units, so the wreckage may be found sooner and evidence can be collected more efficiently. Ocean mapping and underwater surveillance are important as they can reveal resources that would not be available otherwise.

References 

Buoyancy
Fluid mechanics